1979 Dakar Rally, also known as the 1979 Paris–Dakar Rally was the first running of the Dakar Rally event. The rally began on 26 December 1978 from Paris, France and finished on 14 January 1979 in Dakar, Senegal, interrupted by a transfer across the Mediterranean. Cyril Neveu won the motorcycle category on a Yamaha, while the car category was won by Alain Génestier in a Range Rover.

Summary

182 competitors (80 cars, 90 motorcycles and 12 trucks ) contested the inaugural Paris-Dakar Rally, departing the Place du Trocadéro on Boxing Day 1978 to embark upon a 10,000 kilometre journey to the Senegalese capital of Dakar via Algeria, Niger, Mali and Upper Volta. All the vehicles that took part were classified together, although they would compete separately in subsequent editions of the race.

Cyril Neveu won the rally aboard a Yamaha despite not winning any individual stages, taking the lead on the sixth stage after Patrick Schaal (Yamaha) fell and fractured his little finger. Jean-Claude Morellet, competing under the alias of "Fenouil", had been running second until he was forced to retire as his BMW suffered engine failure with less than 200 km of the rally left to run. That promoted Gilles Comte (Yamaha) to second and Philippe Vassard (Honda), the only competitor to complete the Bamako-Nioro stage in the originally allotted time before it was extended, to third.

Alain Génestier's Range Rover was the best of the cars in fourth, ahead of the Renault 4 of the Marreau brothers. Neveu's brother Christophe had led early on in the rally after winning two of the first three stages in his Range Rover, but got lost on the stage between Arlit and Agadez along with around a quarter of the remaining competitors.

Stages

 The above distances (in kilometres) refer only to the competitive timed part of the stage, which make up 3,168 km.

Leading Results

Of the 182 starters, 74 completed the rally.

References

Dakar Rally
Paris–Dakar
Paris–Dakar
Paris–Dakar